(meaning "Dry Lives"; Pre-Reform spelling: Vidas sêcas) is a 1963 Brazilian drama film directed by Nelson Pereira dos Santos, and based on the 1938 novel of the same name by Graciliano Ramos. It tells the story of a poverty-stricken family in the dry Brazilian northeast.

The film stars Átila Iório, Orlando Macedo, Maria Ribeiro and Jofre Soares. It is one of the key films in the Brazilian Cinema Novo movement. It was entered into the 1964 Cannes Film Festival.

Synopsis
1940s. A poor peasant family from the Northeast flees drought and famine. The family is made up of a mother, father and two young sons. After a tiring walk through the sertão, they reach the dilapidated house of Tomas, a friend who has gone to try his luck in other regions. The walk to get to Tomas was very long. The dog makes sure that the kid does not get left behind and at one point the father has to carry the oldest child because he is exhausted. Fabiano, the head of the family, is hired as a cowherd with a fazenda owner who employs Tomas. Life is not easy and Fabiano is indebted to his boss. One Sunday, before a folklore festival, Fabiano is provoked to play cards by a police officer. Although he wins, he gets beaten and dragged to prison. Released, he goes back to work. The mother is mad that he spent all of their money on a drink and on gambling. She really wants to be able to sleep in a leather bed. The drought is raging again so the couple and their children prepare to set out again, desperately looking for fertile land. The father goes out into a field to kill the dog before they leave. The end of the film is a long take of them walking into the barren desert.

The bright sun is a common theme throughout the film. On their journeys to look for a better future, the sun makes it very hard to continue walking. The sun also dries up all of the water and water represents life. Without it everything dies.

Cast
 Átila Iório - Fabiano
 Maria Ribeiro - Sinhá Vitória (Mother)
 Orlando Macedo - Soldado Amarelo (Soldier)
 Joffre Soares - Fazendeiro (Farmer)
 Gilvan Lima - Boy (as Gilvan)
 Genivaldo Lima - Boy (as Genivaldo)

References

External links
 

1963 drama films
1963 films
Brazilian black-and-white films
Brazilian drama films
Films based on Brazilian novels
Films directed by Nelson Pereira dos Santos
Films set in Brazil
1960s Portuguese-language films